is a single released by Japanese pop and R&B singer-songwriter Kana Nishino. It was released on October 21, 2009, by her record label SME Records. The title track was used as a commercial song for Recochoku and the Nippon Television drama Tantei M's theme song.

Track listing

Oricon Charts (Japan)

References 

Kana Nishino songs
2009 singles
Japanese television drama theme songs
RIAJ Digital Track Chart number-one singles
Japanese-language songs
2009 songs